Julio César Martín Trejo (born Cozumel, Q. Roo, October 11, 1964) is an Anglican bishop in Mexico. He has been the diocesan bishop of the Anglican Diocese of the Southeast, in the Anglican Church of Mexico since March 2020. He is one of only two bishops of mainline historical churches (the other being Roman Catholic bishop José Raúl Vera López) who have fully supported gay civil rights in Mexico openly and publicly supporting civil rights for the LGBT community in the territory covered by his diocese by participating in gay pride celebrations leading delegations of local Anglican priests and laity, and calling civil authorities to follow through the Supreme Court resolution declaring all laws discriminating against LGBT people unconstitutional Bishop Martin expressly asked the secular authorities to respect the Federal Supreme Court's decision and legalise gay civil marriage. 
His diocese also spoke out against hate crimes against LGBT people and others. Bishop Martin has also proposed a draft version for the blessing of same-gender couples, though the policy is in discussion and not yet approved. Other clergy in Bishop Martin's diocese support LGBT inclusion in the church.
He has as well been a vocal supporter of progressive policies against which all other national churches are. He has taken part in public demonstrations in support of families of kidnapped and missing persons, has commemorated the students massacred in Plaza de las Tres Culturas in Mexico City in 1968, and has given spiritual support to sexual workers in downtown Mexico City. He is also a supporter of the traditional state policy of separation of church and state entrenched in the Mexican constitution.

In 2022, at the Lambeth Conference, Bishop Martin was the only Mexican and only Spanish-Speaking bishop who signed a pro-LGBTQ statement affirming the holiness of love of all committed same-gender couples.

Early life and education
Martín was born on Cozumel Island into the larger families of politicians of Lebanese Maronite origins (Martín, Borge, Joaquín). Although raised as an atheist, Martín became a Christian (Anglican) at age 20. After studies in archaeology at the National School of Anthropology and History in Mexico City, he discerned a call to ordained ministry which led him to pursue theological studies at San Andres Anglican Seminary in the same city before a year of theological studies at Huron University College, at the University of Western Ontario, London, Ontario, and later at La Salle University in Mexico City. From 1997 to 1998 he conducted research at Episcopal Divinity School, in Cambridge, Mass., for a book on Richard Hooker's 16th-century Anglican theology.  As part of continuing education, he is one of the few priests (only fifteen each year) who have been invited to Windsor Castle, for the special clergy courses offered by St George's House (Windsor Castle), for which he researched on episcopal leadership roles. He is enrolled in an M. A. in Theology and Religious Studies at Atlantic School of Theology, Halifax, Nova Scotia. Martín is proficient in Western European languages and is the author of many published articles about politics and social issues. He is married and has one child.

Ministry
Ordained deacon in 1991, Martin served briefly in Prescott, Ontario, before going back to Mexico and ministering in indigenous rural congregations and in urban parishes from 1992 to 1997. By 1999 he was teaching at the seminary in Mexico City while at the same time ministering as youth chaplain, editor of the diocesan magazine, and as representative of the church to government agencies which led him to appear as a habitual guest on TV and radio programs and meet personalities of the political and religious worlds. He was dean of the Anglican Cathedral in Mexico City for ten years (2001–2010) where he was chaplain to organizations supporting sex workers, before a five-year ministry as rector in Jasper, Alberta, followed by five years as rector of one of the largest parishes in Nova Scotia. In 2018 Martín failed in his bid to become the chaplain of University of King's College chapel at Dalhousie University even though he was one of two final candidates. Elected bishop coadjutor in March 2019 for the Diocese of the Southeast in the Anglican Church of Mexico, he was consecrated on September 21 same year by the bishop of Northern Mexico, the bishop of the Spanish Reformed Episcopal Church, and the suffragan bishop for Europe of the Church of England. The participation of these bishops means that the episcopal lines of apostolic succession from the Old Catholic Church of Utrecht, the (Anglican) Church of Ireland, and the Church of England have entered the Mexican episcopate derived from the Scottish episcopal lineage. Martín was declared diocesan bishop on March 10, 2020.

Consecrators

 The Most Reverend Francisco Moreno, Primate of the Anglican Church of Mexico
 The Right Reverend David Hamid, Suffragan Bishop for Europe (Church of England)
 The Right Reverend Carlos Lopez-Lozano (Bishop of Spain; Spanish Reformed Episcopal Church)

References

Anglican Church of Mexico
Anglican bishops of Southeastern Mexico
1964 births
Living people
Huron University alumni
Atlantic School of Theology alumni
National School of Anthropology and History alumni